The Helena's marsupial frog (Gastrotheca helenae) is a species of frog in the family Hemiphractidae. It is endemic to the Páramo de Tamá on the Venezuelan-Colombian border and occurs in Apure and Táchira states of Venezuela and Norte de Santander Department on the Cordillera Oriental of Colombia. It is named after Helen Gaige, an American herpetologist.

Description
Gastrotheca helenae is a large marsupial frog. The holotype, an adult female, measured  in snout–vent length. The dorsum is smooth and bright green in color; the sides and belly are reddish brown with white markings. The belly and throat are quite rugose. The toes are about half-webbed whereas the fingers have only traces of webbing.

Habitat and conservation
It is much more easily heard than seen.

The species occurs in the Tamá National Natural Park in Colombia and El Tamá National Park in Venezuela. Threats to it are unknown. It was abundant in the mid-1980s when last surveyed.

References

helenae
Amphibians of the Andes
Amphibians of Colombia
Amphibians of Venezuela
Apure
Norte de Santander Department
Táchira
Amphibians described in 1944
Taxa named by Emmett Reid Dunn
Taxonomy articles created by Polbot